Doktor Meluzin is a Czech novel by Bohumil Říha. It was first published in 1973.

1973 Czech novels